The British yeomanry during the First World War were part of the British Army reserve Territorial Force. Initially, in 1914, there were fifty-seven regiments and fourteen mounted brigades. Soon after the declaration of war, second and third line regiments were formed. However, the third line regiments were soon absorbed into the Cavalry Reserve Regiments, to supply replacements for the cavalry and yeomanry. Other horsed regiments in the British Army, during the war, were the regular cavalry regiments and the three regiments belonging to the special reserve: the North Irish Horse, the South Irish Horse and the King Edward's Horse. The senior yeomanry regiments could trace their origins back over 100 years; the oldest regiment, the Royal Wiltshire Yeomanry, had been formed in 1794. The most junior regiment, the Welsh Horse, had only been formed on 18 August 1914, after the start of the war.

To expand the yeomanry, mirror regiments and brigades were formed. The Yorkshire Hussars part of the Yorkshire Mounted Brigade was numbered the 1/1st when the second regiment was raised, which became the 2/1st Yorkshire Hussars in the 2/1st Yorkshire Mounted Brigade and so on. Mounted brigades were often broken up or renumbered, the aforementioned 2/1st Yorkshire later became the 18th Mounted Brigade. Although there were no yeomanry divisions before the war, after mobilisation, the mounted brigades were allocated to specially formed mounted divisions. Some regiments also served alongside regular cavalry regiments in cavalry brigades. While others were assigned to infantry divisions or army corps as their horsed regiment.

The yeomanry fought in several theatres of war. On the Western Front, they were initially used in their traditional role, but during the campaign in Gallipoli, the 2nd Mounted Division fought dismounted. Later, the yeomanry fought on the Macedonian front where, as part of the British Salonika Army, they were once again employed in the mounted role. Further mounted actions followed with the Egyptian Expeditionary Force in the Sinai and Palestine Campaign. Some yeomanry regiments had a mixed war with several being converted to cyclist units. Others became infantry battalions like the 1/1st Yorkshire Hussars, which ended the war as the 9th (Yorkshire Hussars Yeomanry) Battalion, West Yorkshire Regiment. Several regiments serving in the Middle East were converted to infantry and used to form the 74th (Yeomanry) Division, which then fought on in Palestine before being transferred to France. In 1918, other yeomanry regiments were transferred to the Western Front to form battalions of the Machine Gun Corps. By the end of the war, the yeomanry had suffered over 3,800 dead, which included several senior officers.

Prelude

The British yeomanry was formed as a home defence force in 1790s. Each yeoman, then mostly farmers or agricultural workers, was expected to supply his own horse and saddle. They were, however, notoriously better known to the population for their involvement in the Peterloo Massacre in 1819 and the Bristol riots in 1831. In the early years, the standard and number of men in a troop or troops in a regiment differed from county to county with no standard formation. By the 1800s, nationally there were only around 1,500 men, but fear of renewed French militarisation saw a large increase in their numbers by the middle of the century. By that time, the yeomanry volunteer had to provide their own weapons and equipment and attend twenty-four days drill a year.

After the start of the Second Boer War, the British Government called for volunteers and in response 10,000 men enlisted in the Imperial Yeomanry. At the time, the strength of the combined yeomanry regiments was around 8,800 and around 2,200 volunteered for the Imperial Yeomanry. During the war, it was the 7,000 colonial mounted contingent, not the 5,000 regular British cavalry, that led the way in tactical development. They were better trained, armed and more efficient, if only because they had been correctly trained to use the right weapons and tactics for the conflict. Since 1880, British cavalrymen had only been armed with carbines and swords, although some also carried a lance. The regular cavalry regiments were considered so poor that General Sir Redvers Henry Buller, commanding the advance into Northern Natal, left his six regiments of cavalry behind at Ladysmith, trusting in the irregular mounted forces to carry out patrolling.

After the war, in 1905, the then Secretary of State for War, Richard Haldane started a reorganisation of the army and reserves. The Haldane Reforms and the Territorial and Reserve Forces Act 1907 gave the British Army the capability of forming an expeditionary force. The act also incorporated regular payment for Territorial Force soldiers and training, which included an annual two-week training camp. As a result, when the Territorial Force was formed it was decided there would be fourteen mounted brigades. Each of these brigades consisted of three yeomanry regiments, one artillery battery from the Royal Horse Artillery or the Honourable Artillery Company, an ammunition column, a transport and supply column and a field ambulance.

Background

In August 1914, before the start of the First World War, there were fifty-five yeomanry regiments. Together with the thirty-one regular cavalry regiments and three regiments of horse, which were part of the Special Reserve, these formed the mounted troops of the British Army. However, soon after, the yeomanry was greatly expanded; two new regiments, the Welsh Horse and the 3rd Scottish Horse, were raised and all regiments, old and new, formed second line regiments, raising the total to 114. Twelve regiments were broken up to provide divisional reconnaissance squadrons for infantry divisions on the Western Front. Another five served alongside the regular cavalry in the 1st, 2nd and 3rd Cavalry Divisions in the same theatre. The largest contingent, forty regiments, served in the Middle East, thirty-one of them in a dismounted role during the Gallipoli Campaign. The second line regiments mostly remained in Great Britain as mounted troops until after 1915, when they were eventually transferred to other formations.

The regiment

The British yeomanry regiment of 1914 was composed of twenty-six officers and 523 other ranks. The commanding officer was a lieutenant colonel, with a major as the second in command; other officers in the headquarters were an adjutant, quartermaster, signals officer, medical officer and a veterinary officer. The other ranks comprised one warrant officer, thirty-seven senior non-commissioned officers, twenty-two artificers, six trumpeters and 457 privates.

Of these men, forty-eight were part of the regimental headquarters and twenty-seven were in the machine gun section armed, which was armed with two Vickers Machine Guns. In 1909, the School of Musketry proposed each regiment should have six machine guns but this was declined for "financial reasons". The remaining 474 men were in the regiment's three squadrons, four troops per squadron. Commanded by a major with a captain as the second in command, a squadron had 158 men; six officers, a Squadron Sergeant Major, a Squadron Quartermaster Sergeant, eight sergeants, two trumpeters, six artificers, and 134 other ranks. While the troop had one officer, two sergeants, one artificer and thirty other ranks.

To look after the regiment's horses, attached to the regimental headquarters was a veterinary officer, a quartermaster sergeant farrier, who was also responsible for killing wounded and sick horses, a saddler sergeant and a saddle-tree maker. Each squadron had two saddlers, one a sergeant, and each troop a shoeing smith. The regiment had 528 riding horses, seventy-four draught horses, six pack horses, eighteen carts or horse-drawn wagons and fifteen bicycles.

British yeomanry were armed with a 1908 pattern sword, and Lee–Enfield rifles, unlike their French and German counterparts, who were only armed with a shorter range carbine. As the war progressed, they were issued with brodie helmets, hand grenades, trench mortars and Hotchkiss light machine guns. Like the infantry, they were dressed in a khaki uniform, with a service dress cap, and instead of infantry webbing, they carried their ammunition in a bandolier. The French cuirassiers, by comparison, would not have looked out of place in the Napoleonic Wars. Still wearing blue and red uniforms, with breast and back metal plates and plumed brass-steel helmets. While the Germans had a standard field grey uniform their uhlans still wore Polish style czapka helmets tunics with plastron fronts, the hussars frogged jackets, and the cuirassiers steel spiked helmets.

Yeomanry divisions and brigades

On 5 August 1914, the 1st Mounted Division was formed with the Eastern, 1st South Midland, 2nd South Midland and the Nottinghamshire and Derbyshire, and based in the Bury St Edmunds area. On 2 September 1914 the 2nd Mounted Division was formed, initially at Goring, but moved to Norfolk in November, the 1st and 2nd South Midlands, the Nottinghamshire and Derbyshire, and the London Mounted Brigades came under their command. While the 1st Mounted Division assumed command of the Eastern, South Wales, Welsh Border, North Midland Mounted Brigades and the Cyclist Brigade. There was also a 3rd Mounted Division, originally the 2/2nd Mounted Division, and a 4th Mounted Division for the second line brigades.

The only yeomanry division to see active service was the 2nd Mounted Division now comprising the 1st, 2nd, 3rd, 4th and 5th Mounted Brigades. The division served in the campaign at Gallipoli from August 1915. By September, casualties forced a re-organisation, the survivors formed the 1st and 2nd Composite Mounted Brigades, and the division was reinforced by the Scottish Horse Mounted Brigade and the Highland Mounted Brigade. In the following December, the survivors were withdrawn to Egypt and the division was disbanded in January 1916. The regiments now served in the Sinai and Palestine Campaign and formed several new brigades. The 5th, 6th, 7th, 8th and 22nd Mounted Brigade. These brigades served in the Imperial Mounted Division, the ANZAC Mounted Division, and after a further re-organisation in the 4th and 5th Cavalry Divisions. The brigades in the two cavalry divisions consisted of one yeomanry and two British Indian Army cavalry regiments. The 7th Mounted Brigade also served, as an independent unit, with the British Salonika Army on the Macedonian front.

Other yeomanry regiments that had served at Gallipoli and withdrawn to Egypt, were formed into the 1st, 2nd, 3rd and 4th Dismounted Brigades, and deployed to defend the Suez Canal. Eighteen regiments were then converted to twelve infantry battalions, and assigned to the 74th (Yeomanry) Division in March 1917. The division fought in several engagements in the Sinai before being transferred to France.

Victoria Cross recipients

The Victoria Cross is the United Kingdom's highest award for valour in the face of the enemy. Six yeoman were recipients of the award during the First World War.

The first was awarded 21 August 1915, to Private Fred Potts of the Berkshire Yeomanry, during the Battle of Scimitar Hill part of the Gallipoli Campaign. Lance-Corporal Harold Sandford Mugford of the Essex Yeomanry attached to the 8th Squadron, Machine Gun Corps was the second recipient 11 April 1917 during the Battle of Arras. Major Alexander Malins Lafone of the Duke of Cambridge's Hussars for his actions on 27 October 1917 in the Battle of El Buggar Ridge. In 1918, there were three awards, first to Private Harold Whitfield, 10th (Shropshire and Cheshire Yeomanry) Battalion, King's Shropshire Light Infantry 10 March 1918 during the Battle of Tell 'Asur in Palestine. A posthumous award to Acting Lieutenant-Colonel Oliver Cyril Spencer Watson also of the Duke of Cambridge's Hussars, while commanding the 2nd/5th Battalion, Kings Own Yorkshire Light Infantry on 28 March at Rossignol Wood during the German spring offensive in France. The last award was on 31 October 1918 to Sergeant Thomas Caldwell of the 12th (Ayr and Lanark Yeomanry) Battalion, Royal Scots Fusiliers at Audenarde France during the Hundred Days Offensive.

Aftermath

Casualties

The British yeomanry did not have the same huge casualty lists, common among the infantry regiments. The Queen's Own Worcestershire Hussars with 215 had the highest total dead, while the 1st County of London Yeomanry (Middlesex, Duke of Cambridge's Hussars) only had eight dead. The greatest loss on one day was ninety-three from the Leicestershire Yeomanry on 13 May 1915, during the Second Battle of Ypres. Out of the fifty-four regiments, three had over 200 dead, ten of them over 100 dead, sixteen had fifty or more dead and the remainder less than fifty dead. According to the Commonwealth War Graves Commission the yeomanry regiments total dead during the First World War was 3,867 men,
among that total was Brigadier-General Wight-Boycott of the Warwickshire Yeomanry, and nineteen lieutenant-colonels some while serving with other units.

Conversion to artillery

After the war, the British Government decided to reduce the number of yeomanry regiments down from the pre-war total of fifty-five. The fourteen senior regiments would remain as yeomanry cavalry while the majority of the remainder were converted to artillery, joining the Royal Artillery.

The 1st County of London Yeomanry (Duke of Cambridge's Hussars), were at the time uniquely converted to a signals regiment in the newly formed Royal Corps of Signals.

Yeomanry today

The yeomanry is still represented in the Army Reserve of the British Army of the 21st Century. The largest contingent is still associated with the successors to the cavalry, the Royal Armoured Corps, with four regiments, each made up of several squadrons representing an old yeomanry regiment. They are the Royal Yeomanry, the Royal Wessex Yeomanry, the Queen's Own Yeomanry and the Scottish and North Irish Yeomanry.

Other Yeomanry sub-units serve in other corps. The Royal Signals have the 71st (City of London) Yeomanry Signal Regiment (Volunteers), as well as four independent Yeomanry squadrons. The Royal Artillery have 106 (Yeomanry) Regiment, and the Army Air Corps has No. 677 (Suffolk and Norfolk Yeomanry) Squadron AAC. The Royal Logistic Corps also has four squadrons which are affiliated to Yeomanry regiments.

Territorial Force mounted brigades

When the Territorial Force was formed, there were only fourteen mounted brigades, those regiments that were not part of the pre-war organisation were now attached to brigades (marked ** below). At the same time, a fifteenth brigade was raised in Scotland. Another brigade was formed in Egypt in January 1915; it served dismounted in Gallipoli with the 2nd Mounted Division before being broken up in Egypt in March 1916.

See also
British cavalry during the First World War
Second line yeomanry regiments of the British Army
 British First World War cavalry generals

References
Footnotes

Citations

Bibliography

 

 

 
 
Army Reserve (United Kingdom)
British Army in World War I